Mary Willis Walker (born May 24, 1942, Fox Point, Wisconsin) is an American crime fiction author.

Life
Walker graduated from Duke University in English and took up high school teaching. She married in 1967 to Lee Walker who became president of Dell Computers, living in New York and Virginia before moving to Austin, Texas. They have two daughters, Amanda and Susannah. The couple divorced when she was 51. She returned to her maiden name of Mary Willis, but continued to published as Mary Willis Walker, which, she wrote in an article for the New York Times Magazine, she now considers a pen name.  She continues to live in Austin.

Writing
She began writing in her mid-forties, which she characterized as " 'pretty late to start' ".  She spent two years writing her first published thriller, Zero at the Bone, which was published in 1991. Her second Texas-based mystery, Red Scream, was Walker's first to feature sleuth Molly Cates. Red Scream won the Best Mystery Edgar Award in 1993. Under the Beetle's Cellar, published in 1995, was Walker's third mystery.

Bibliography
Zero at the Bone (1991)
"Molly Cates" series
The Red Scream (1994)
Under the Beetle's Cellar (1995)
All the Dead Lie Down (1998)

Selected awards 
1991: Agatha Award for best first novel for Zero at the Bone 
1992: Macavity Award for best first novel for Zero at the Bone
1995: Edgar Award for Best Novel for The Red Scream 
1996: Macavity Award for Under the Beetle's Cellar
1996: Anthony Award for Under the Beetle's Cellar
1998: Martin Beck Award for Under the Beetle's Cellar

Footnotes

References

External links
How I Gave Up My Alias by Mary Willis, The New York Times, October 16, 1994

1942 births
Living people
20th-century American novelists
American crime fiction writers
American women novelists
Agatha Award winners
Anthony Award winners
Duke University Trinity College of Arts and Sciences alumni
Edgar Award winners
Macavity Award winners
Writers from Austin, Texas
People from Fox Point, Wisconsin
Novelists from Wisconsin
Women mystery writers
20th-century American women writers
Novelists from Texas